Rebecca Murray (born March 15, 1990) is an American former wheelchair basketball player. She is a two-time Parapan American Games gold medalist in both 2007 and 2011. In 2010, she won two more gold medals at IWBF World Championship and at U25 World Championship in 2011.

Early life
Murray was born on March 15, 1990, in Milwaukee, Wisconsin to parents Richard and Linda Murray. She was born with spina bifida which paralyzed her from the waist down. She first started playing wheelchair basketball at the age of six through the assistance of the IndependenceFirst organization. Murray remained with the sport and began attending a University of Wisconsin–Whitewater wheelchair basketball camp before joining the Milwaukee Wizards at the age of 12.

Murray graduated from Germantown High School in 2008 and enrolled at the University of Wisconsin–Whitewater for a degree in special education.

Career
At the age of 18, Murray made her Summer Paralympic Games debut at the 2008 Summer Paralympics where she helped the United States women's national wheelchair basketball team win a gold medal. Following this, she became a IWBF World Championships gold medalist in 2010 and a Parapan American Games gold medalist in 2011.

During the 2016 Summer Paralympics, Murray was the leading scorer in both games leading up to the gold medal round. She scored 31 points in the semi-final win against Great Britain and 33 points to win the gold medal over Germany. As a result of her play, she was named a finalist for Team USA's Female Athlete of the Paralympic Games. Following the Games, Murray took a break from competition but returned for the qualifications for the 2020 Summer Paralympics. However, as a result of the COVID-19 pandemic, Murray chose to quit the sport before the Games began.

References

External links
 
 
 

1990 births
Living people
American women's wheelchair basketball players
Paralympic wheelchair basketball players of the United States
Paralympic gold medalists for the United States
Paralympic medalists in wheelchair basketball
Wheelchair basketball players at the 2008 Summer Paralympics
Wheelchair basketball players at the 2012 Summer Paralympics
Wheelchair basketball players at the 2016 Summer Paralympics
Medalists at the 2008 Summer Paralympics
Medalists at the 2016 Summer Paralympics
Basketball players from Milwaukee
21st-century American women